Tina Chandler (born September 2, 1974) is an American professional female bodybuilder.

Early life and education
Tina Chandler was born in 1974 in Shreveport, Louisiana, the second of three children. She grew up in Conroe and Willis, Texas. She attended Sam Houston State University.

Bodybuilding career

Amateur
During her childhood, Tina was a competitive gymnast; in addition to all the sports available at the schools she attended (volleyball, track, basketball, tennis, cycling, cheerleading), she got involved in weight training from the sports. Soon after, her career as a gymnast had ended and she needed something to get her in shape, so she sought information from the magazine Muscle and Fitness. She soon found herself in the weight room more and more as I was pleased with some of the results she was getting quickly. She attended her first bodybuilding competition, the SW Texas State, in 2004, which she won. She won her IFBB pro card after coming in 1st in the middleweight class at the 2007 NPC Nationals.

Professional
In 2009, Tina attended her first Ms. Olympia competition, which she placed 10th.

Contest history
 2004 SW Texas State - 1st (MW)
 2005 Lone Star Classic - 1st (MW and overall)
 2005 NPC USA - 2nd (MW)
 2006 NPC USA - 1st (MW)
 2006 NPC Nationals - 5th (MW)
 2007 NPC Nationals - 1st (MW)
 2008 IFBB New York Pro - 7th
 2009 IFBB Tampa Pro - 3rd
 2009 IFBB Ms Olympia - 10th
 2010 IFBB Tampa Pro - 2nd
 2010 IFBB Ms. Olympia - 8th
 2011 IFBB Ms. International - 8th
 2011 IFBB Ms. Olympia - 10th
 2011 IFBB Tampa Pro Championships - 2nd
 2012 IFBB Ms. International - 13th
 2013 IFBB Chicago Pro Championships - 3rd
 2013 IFBB Tampa Pro Championships - 4th
 2013 IFBB Ms. Olympia - 12th

Personal life
Chandler currently lives in Houston, Texas.

See also
Female bodybuilding
List of female professional bodybuilders

References

External links

1974 births
American female bodybuilders
Living people
People from Caddo Parish, Louisiana
People from Conroe, Texas
People from Willis, Texas
Sam Houston State University alumni
Professional bodybuilders
Sportspeople from Louisiana
Sportspeople from Shreveport, Louisiana
Sportspeople from Texas
Sportspeople from Houston
21st-century American women